David Charles Bury (born December 9, 1942) is a senior United States district judge of the United States District Court for the District of Arizona.

Education and career

Born in Tulsa, Oklahoma, Bury received a Bachelor of Science from Oklahoma State University in 1964 and a Juris Doctor from the University of Arizona College of Law in 1967. He was in private practice in Tucson, Arizona, from 1967 to 2002.

District court service

On September 10, 2001, Bury was nominated by President George W. Bush to a new seat on the United States District Court for the District of Arizona created by 114 Stat. 2762. He was confirmed by the United States Senate on March 15, 2002, and received his commission on March 19, 2002. He took senior status on December 31, 2012 and was succeeded by Judge James Alan Soto.

Sources

1942 births
Living people
James E. Rogers College of Law alumni
Judges of the United States District Court for the District of Arizona
Oklahoma State University alumni
Lawyers from Tulsa, Oklahoma
United States district court judges appointed by George W. Bush
21st-century American judges